Five special routes of U.S. Route 127 (US 127) exist in Kentucky. There are two business loops and three bypasses of US 127 in Kentucky. Additionally, there have been 10 different business routes of U.S. Route 127 in Michigan.

Albany business route

U.S. Route 127 Business is a business route of U.S. Route 127 in Albany, Kentucky. The town was bypassed entirely when the new alignment of US 127's main route was completed in 2014.

Jamestown business route 

U.S. Route 127 Business is a business route of U.S. Route 127 in Jamestown, Kentucky. The complete bypassing of US 127's main alignment was complete in 2010.

US 127 Bus. runs through downtown Jamestown, while US 127 bypasses the town to the west. The route intersects and overlaps Kentucky Route 92 (KY 92) and KY 619.

Danville bypass

U.S. Route 127 Bypass (US 127 Byp.) is a bypass U.S. Route in Danville. The route bypasses Danville to the west, while US 127 runs through downtown. The route is overlapped with US 150 Byp. for about the first half of its length. The route additionally intersects with U.S. Route 150 along with Kentucky Route 37 (KY 37), KY 34, and KY 52.

Harrodsburg bypass

U.S. Route 127 Bypass (US 127 Byp.) is a bypass U.S. Route in Harrodsburg, Kentucky. The route bypasses Harrodsburg to the east while US 127 runs through downtown. It intersects with US 68 along with Kentucky Route 152 (KY 152) and KY 1989.

Lawrenceburg bypass

U.S. Route 127 Bypass (US 127 Byp.) bypasses Lawrenceburg, Kentucky to the west. The route crosses US 62 and Kentucky Route 44.

See also

References

27-1
27-1
Kentucky